FELDA Mempaga is one of the FELDA settlements in Bentong District, Pahang, Malaysia. The Federal Land Development Authority  is a Malaysian government agency handling the resettlement of rural poor into newly developed areas. The Mempaga Correctional Centre (Pusat Serenti Mempaga) is one of the government agencies in the settlement.

List of FELDA settlements
FELDA Mempaga 1
FELDA Mempaga 2
FELDA Mempaga 3

References

Bentong District
Populated places in Pahang
Federal Land Development Authority settlements
Villages in Pahang